is a passenger railway station in the city of Takasaki, Gunma, Japan, operated by the private railway operator Jōshin Dentetsu.

Lines

Station layout
The station has a single side platform serving traffic in both directions.

Adjacent stations

History
Negoya Station opened on 1 June 1926.

Surrounding area
site of Negoya Castle

See also
 List of railway stations in Japan

External links

 Jōshin Dentetsu 
  Burari-Gunma 

Railway stations in Gunma Prefecture
Railway stations in Japan opened in 1926
Takasaki, Gunma